A gilet is a sleeveless jacket.

Gilet may also refer to:

 Gilet, Valencia, a municipality in eastern Spain
 Gilet (card game)
 Gilet (name)

See also
 Gillet (disambiguation)
 Gillet, a Belgian automobile manufacturer
 Gillette (disambiguation)